Avatar: The Last Airbender – The Burning Earth (known as Avatar: The Legend of Aang – The Burning Earth in Europe) is a 2007 video game for Game Boy Advance, Nintendo DS, PlayStation 2, Wii, and Xbox 360 based on the animated television series Avatar: The Last Airbender. It was one of the last games released for the Game Boy Advance in North America and Europe. It is the sequel to the 2006 game Avatar: The Last Airbender. The game was followed by a sequel, Avatar: The Last Airbender – Into the Inferno, in 2008.

The game is known for the ease with which the full 1000 gamer points could be unlocked on the Xbox 360, something that could be done in under five minutes.

Plot
The first chapter of the game sees the player leaving a vessel with Northern Water Tribe officials, including Master Pakku. Aang, Sokka, and Katara make their way to the Earth Kingdom fortress of General Fong, who upon arrival immediately sets a pair of guards upon the Avatar to test his skills.

Marketing and release
A demo was displayed at the 2007 San Diego Comic-Con by THQ, with a release for the Xbox 360, PlayStation 2, Wii, Nintendo DS, and Game Boy Advance scheduled for that fall.

Reception

Avatar: The Last Airbender – The Burning Earth received "mixed or average" reviews across all platforms according to review aggregator Metacritic.

References

2007 video games
THQ games
Tose (company) games
Wii games
Nintendo DS games
Game Boy Advance games
PlayStation 2 games
Xbox 360 games
Burning Earth
Video games developed in Australia
Multiplayer and single-player video games
Halfbrick Studios games